Jesús Berrocal Campos (born 5 February 1988) is a Spanish professional footballer who plays for Viveiro CF as a forward.

Club career
Born in Córdoba, Andalusia, Berrocal spent his first years as a senior with Real Madrid's C team. In January 2009 he was loaned to Racing de Santander, playing with both the first and B sides with the Cantabrians. On 1 March 2009, he first appeared for the main squad and in La Liga, playing the last minute of the 1–1 home draw against CA Osasuna. The following week, again from the bench, he scored in a 5–3 loss at Deportivo de La Coruña.

For the 2009–10 season, Berrocal was released by Real Madrid and signed a two-year deal with Granada CF of Segunda División B. He appeared regularly throughout his first year as the latter returned to the Segunda División after more than 20 years, contributing five goals. However, he would be released in the summer, moving to another club in that league, AD Ceuta.

On 26 June 2013, after spells with CD San Roque de Lepe (third division) and Recreativo de Huelva (second), Berrocal joined a host of compatriots at Buriram United F.C. in the Thai Premier League. He marked his league debut with a goal, in a 2–1 away win over Suphanburi FC.

Personal life
Still an active player, Berrocal worked occasionally as a model.

Honours
Granada
Segunda División B: 2009–10

Buriram United
Thai Premier League: 2013
Thai FA Cup: 2013

Spain U19
UEFA European Under-19 Championship: 2007

References

External links

1988 births
Living people
Spanish footballers
Footballers from Córdoba, Spain
Association football forwards
La Liga players
Segunda División players
Segunda División B players
Tercera División players
Tercera Federación players
Real Madrid C footballers
Real Madrid Castilla footballers
Rayo Cantabria players
Racing de Santander players
Granada CF footballers
AD Ceuta footballers
CD San Roque de Lepe footballers
Recreativo de Huelva players
SD Ponferradina players
Hércules CF players
Pontevedra CF footballers
Villarrubia CF players
Jesus Berrocal
Jesus Berrocal
Spain youth international footballers
Spanish expatriate footballers
Expatriate footballers in Thailand
Spanish expatriate sportspeople in Thailand